Farzad Abdollahi (born 27 October 1990 in Mianeh, Iran) is an Iranian taekwondo practitioner. He won the gold medal in the welterweight division (80 kg) at the 2011 World Taekwondo Championships in Gyeongju, South Korea.

Abdollahi is a cousin of another world taekwondo champion, Yousef Karami.

References
 Guangzhou 2010 profile

External links
 

Iranian male taekwondo practitioners
1990 births
Living people
People from Mianeh
Asian Games bronze medalists for Iran
Asian Games medalists in taekwondo
Taekwondo practitioners at the 2010 Asian Games
Medalists at the 2010 Asian Games
Asian Taekwondo Championships medalists
World Taekwondo Championships medalists
20th-century Iranian people
21st-century Iranian people